Pentagonicini is a tribe of ground beetles in the family Carabidae. There is at least one genus and about 10 described species in Pentagonicini.

A genus of Pentagonicini is Pentagonica Schmidt-Göbel, 1846.

References

 Bouchard, P., Y. Bousquet, A. Davies, M. Alonso-Zarazaga, J. Lawrence, C. Lyal, A. Newton, et al. (2011). "Family-group names in Coleoptera (Insecta)". ZooKeys, vol. 88, 1–972.
 Bousquet, Yves, and André Larochelle (1993). "Catalogue of the Geadephaga (Coleoptera: Trachypachidae, Rhysodidae, Carabidae including Cicindelini) of America North of Mexico". Memoirs of the Entomological Society of Canada, no. 167, 397.
 Riley K, Browne R (2011). "Changes in ground beetle diversity and community composition in age structured forests (Coleoptera, Carabidae)". ZooKeys 147: 601–621.

Further reading

 Arnett, R. H. Jr., and M. C. Thomas. (eds.). (21 December 2000) American Beetles, Volume I: Archostemata, Myxophaga, Adephaga, Polyphaga: Staphyliniformia. CRC Press LLC, Boca Raton, Florida. 
 Arnett, Ross H. (2000). American Insects: A Handbook of the Insects of America North of Mexico. CRC Press.
 Richard E. White. (1983). Peterson Field Guides: Beetles. Houghton Mifflin Company.

Harpalinae